Somerset MRT station is an underground Mass Rapid Transit (MRT) station on the North South Line in Orchard, Singapore. It is one of the three stations located along the popular shopping belt, Orchard Road.

The station connects to Comcentre, Singapore Power Building, Skate Park, 313@Somerset, Orchard Gateway, Orchard Central, Cathay Cineleisure Orchard, Centrepoint Shopping Centre, Mandarin Orchard, The Heeren, Faber House, Orchard Point, Peranakan Place and Emerald Hill.

Opened in 1987, Somerset station was part of the early plans for the original MRT network since 1982. It was constructed as part of Phase I of the MRT network. Following the network's operational split, the station has been served by the North South line since 1989.

History

The station was built as part of the first phase of construction of the MRT system. Initially named Killiney, the station was renamed to its current name in November 1982 after Somerset Road, which runs above it. In January 1984, a joint venture between Borie SAE, Cogefar SPA, Traylor Bros and Ong Chwee Kou Building Contractors secured Contract 106A, the S$39.2 million contract to build Somerset station, since the joint venture was already handling construction of the tunnels adjacent to the station.

To facilitate the station's construction, the Urban Redevelopment Authority (URA) requisitioned the Ng Teow Yhee Building, which was located within the station site, in 1983,and Somerset Road was diverted in October 1984. Somerset station was opened on 12 December 1987 as part of the extension of the MRT network from Toa Payoh to Outram Park.

Construction of the lifts started on 28 June 2000 and were completed on 11 July 2002. Exit B of the station was heavily renovated from January 2007 to July 2009. An additional entrance, Exit D, was opened in conjunction with Orchard Gateway on 25 April 2014 along with Exit C which also connects to Orchard Gateway.

Station details
The station is located under Somerset Road and is near landmarks such as Orchard Central, 313@Somerset, Comcentre, the Centrepoint and 111 Somerset. It is served by the North South Line, between Orchard and Dhoby Ghaut stations, and has the station code NS23.

Somerset station was designed to function as a bomb shelter, and was fitted out with blast doors and thick walls of reinforced concrete to withstand bomb impacts. Plants grown with the aid of hydroponics were planted in the station for aesthetic purposes. and the station has a wall mural by local artistes Leo Hee Tong and Ho Ho Ying.

References

External links

 

Railway stations in Singapore opened in 1987
Orchard Road
Orchard, Singapore
Mass Rapid Transit (Singapore) stations